The Ministry of Finance (Spanish: Ministerio de Hacienda), also Ministry of Internal Revenue, of the Dominican Republic is the government institution in charge of preparing, executing and evaluating the coutry's fiscal policies, including national income, expenses and finance and securing its sustainability in relation to the economical policies. Other functions are to propose fiscal and customs legislation, regulate loans' authorization and negotiation, approve public contracting, and periodically prepare the state of the budget, finance and economy.

It was established on the first Dominican Constitution of 1844 as the Secretary of State of Finance and Trade (Secretaría de Estado de Hacienda y Comercio). Its headquarters are located at Santo Domingo. Since August 16, 2020, its Minister is José Manuel Vicente.

History 
The origin of this Ministry can be found on the first Dominican Constitution, signed on November 6, 1844. This document specified that:

A few days later, on November 14, 1844 the office was officially created as the Secretary of State of Finance and Trade (Secretaría de Estado de Hacienda y Comercio), being its first ministre-secretary Ricardo Miura. The office was also held in its early days by national hero Ramón Matías Mella, as well as José Manuel Caminero, Jacinto de la Concha and José Joaquín Puello.

During the Second Republic (1865-1916), this institution saw several financial crisis that damaged the politics of the Dominican Republic. President Ulises Heureaux's government was characterized by the unsupported issue of banknotes and the unmessured debt to foreign companies. This situation led to the Dominico-American Convention of 1907 during the presidency of Ramón Cáceres, which ceded Dominican customs to the United States. This eventually led to the American occupation of the Dominican Republic (1916-1924). During this period, the institution is renamed Secretary of Treasury and Finance (Secretaría de Estado del Tesoro y Hacienda).

During the Third Republic (1924-1965), this office was renamed several times, being known for a time as Secretary of State of Finance, Labour and Communications (Secretaría de Estado de Hacienda, Trabajo y Comunicaciones). At the start of the Fourth Republic in 1965, it was known as Secretary of State of Finance (Secretaría de Estado de Finanzas).

On 2006, Law no. 494-06 reorganized the institution, which was renamed from Finanzas to Hacienda, which in English can be translated as both finance or internal revenue. At the same, the government created a new departement, the Secretary of State of Economy, Planning and Development (Secretaría de Estado de Economía, Planificación y Desarrollo).

It adopted its current name, Ministry of Finance or Internal Revenue (Ministerio de Hacienda), after the 2010 Constitutional reform and the subsequent Decree no. 56-10 which changed the names of all government agencies.

Internal structure 
As all other Ministries of the Dominican Republic, the Ministry of Finance is subdivided into vice-ministries. These are:

 Technical-Administrative Vice-ministry
 Vice-ministry of Budget, Accounting and Assets
 Vice-ministry of State Assets
 Vice-ministry of the Treasury
 Vice-ministry of Public Credit
 Vice-ministry of Fiscal Policy

Affiliated agencies 

As fiscal regulator, the Ministry of Finance has a great number of decentralized institutions. Some of these are:

 Superintendency of Insurance
 General Office of Customs (DGA)
 General Office of Internal Revenue (DGII)
 General Office of National Cadastre
 General Office of Budget
 General Office of Public Credit
 Bank of Reserves of the Dominican Republic (BanReservas)
 National Treasury
 National Lottery
 Savings Fund for Workers and Monte de Piedad

List of renowned secretaries and ministers
Ramón Matías Mella, 1849–1850
Manuel María Gautier, 1876
Francisco Gregorio Billini, 1878
Arturo Grullón, 1912
Francisco J. Peynado, 1916
 Eladio Sánchez, 1922–1923
Tulio Manuel Cestero, 1933
Rafael Brache, 1933–1934
Manuel de Jesús Troncoso, 1944–1945
Victor Garrido, 1947–1949
José Manuel Machado, 1961–1962
Jacobo Majluta, 1963
José Rafael Abinader, 1965
José Rafael Abinader, 1982–1984
Licelot Marte de Barrios, 1990–1993
Daniel Toribio, 1996–2000; 2011-2012
Simón Lizardo Mézquita, 2012–2016
Donald Guerrero, 2016–2020
José Manuel Vicente, 2020–

See also 
 Cabinet of the Dominican Republic

References

External links 
 
 Secretariat of State for Finance

Finance, Secretary of State for
Dominican Republic
1844 establishments in the Dominican Republic
Economy of the Dominican Republic